The list of shipwrecks in March 1941 includes all ships sunk, foundered, grounded, or otherwise lost during March 1941.

1 March

2 March

3 March

4 March

5 March

6 March

7 March

8 March

9 March

10 March

11 March

12 March

13 March

14 March

15 March

16 March

17 March

18 March

19 March

20 March

21 March

22 March

23 March

24 March

25 March

26 March

27 March
For the constructive total loss of the South African tanker Tafelburg'' on this day see the entry for 28 January 1941

28 March

29 March

30 March

31 March

Unknown date

References

1941-03